Río Grande is a corregimiento in Penonomé District, Coclé Province, Panama with a population of 3,117 as of 2010. Its population as of 1990 was 2,411; its population as of 2000 was 2,915.

References

Corregimientos of Coclé Province